DaDa is the eighth solo studio album by American rock singer Alice Cooper, released on September 28, 1983 by Warner Bros. Records. DaDa would be Cooper's final studio album until his sober re-emergence in 1986 with the album Constrictor. Its cover art was based on a painting by surrealist artist Salvador Dalí titled Slave Market with the Disappearing Bust of Voltaire (1940). Produced by long-time collaborator Bob Ezrin, at the time his first production with Cooper in six years, DaDa was recorded at ESP Studios in Buttonville, Ontario, Canada.

DaDa peaked at No. 93 in the UK but failed to dent the US Billboard 200. "I Love America" was released as a single solely in the UK over a month after the album's release.

Guitarist and co-songwriter Dick Wagner revealed in 2014 that Cooper had relapsed to drinking heavily during the recording of DaDa, and had suggested that the album was a contract fulfillment requirement for which Warner Bros. was not pleased and consequently made no effort to promote, though Warner Bros. has never confirmed or denied this. This and other details, like the real-life cocktail waitresses that inspired "Scarlet and Sheba" are in his autobiography Not Only Women Bleed (2011).

Cooper reportedly has no recollection of recording DaDa, or the preceding studio albums Special Forces (1981) and Zipper Catches Skin (1982), due to substance abuse. Cooper stated "I wrote them, recorded them and toured them and I don't remember much of any of that", though he toured only Special Forces. In 1996 Cooper said that DaDa was the scariest album he ever made, and that he never had any idea what it was about. There was no tour to promote DaDa, and none of its songs have ever been played live.

DaDa was Cooper’s final studio album for his long-time label Warner Bros., and after its release he took a three-year hiatus from the music industry.

Track listing

Personnel
Credits are adapted from the DaDa liner notes.

Musicians
 Alice Cooper – vocals
 Dick Wagner – guitar; bass guitar; backing vocals
 Prakash John – bass guitar on “Fresh Blood”
 Richard Kolinka – drums
 Graham Shaw – Oberheim OB-X; Roland Jupiter; backing vocals
 Bob Ezrin – Fairlight CMI programming; keyboards; drums; percussion
 John Anderson – drums
 Karen Hendricks – backing vocals
 Lisa DalBello – backing vocals

Production
 Bob Ezrin – producer; engineer
 Dick Wagner – associate producer

Influence
DaDa is cited as the main inspiration behind the birth of the Italian gothic and shock rock band the Mugshots, the first ever European band produced by Dick Wagner, who is also featured on "Love, Lust and Revenge". That EP contains the first cover ever recorded of "Pass the Gun Around", a live favourite for the Mugshots.

References

External links
 

Alice Cooper albums
1983 albums
Albums produced by Bob Ezrin
Concept albums
Warner Records albums
Art rock albums by American artists